Flash art may refer to:
Flash Art
Flash (tattoo)